Charles Frye could refer to: 

Charlie Frye (born 1981), American football player and coach
Charlie Frye (baseball) (1913–1945), American Major League Baseball pitcher

See also
Charles Fried (born 1935), American jurist and lawyer
Charles Fries (disambiguation)
Charles Fry (disambiguation)